The role of a Catholic catechist is to catechise (teach) the faith of the Catholic Church by both word and example.

Catechising

To catechize means to teach: more specifically, to teach by word of mouth. Prior to the Second Vatican Council, the chief catechists at the parish level were priests, religious brothers or sisters. Since the late 20th century, particularly in Europe and the Americas, increasingly the role of the parish catechist has been undertaken by the Catholic laity. In addition to activities in the parish, catechizing also takes place in Catholic schools through more formal classes as part of the curriculum.

Catechists are often deployed to teach candidates who are preparing for the sacraments of Reconciliation, First Holy Communion, Confirmation and Baptism (after completing the Rite of Christian Initiation of Adults, or RCIA). Various age-appropriate religious education texts and materials are used for instruction in addition to the Catechism of the Catholic Church.

Catechists have always been of particular importance in large geographical parishes, such as in Africa, where priests have historically only been able to visit different parts of their parish periodically. In the priest's absence, the parish catechist takes on the role of being the main teacher of the faith in that parish. As such they are afforded a particular place of honor within their parish community.

General Instruction of the Roman Missal
The General Instruction of the Roman Missal allows for institution of catechists should a particular Bishops' Conference feel that it is required.

A Bishops' Conference may request permission from the Apostolic See:

Guide for Catechists
In 1993 the Congregation for the Evangelization of Peoples (formerly the Sacred Congregation for the Propagation of the Faith) published the Guide for Catechists, with the sub-heading Document of vocational, formative and promotional orientation of Catechists in the territories dependent on the Congregation for the Evangelization of Peoples.

This document was therefore intended only for catechists at work in the missionary territories of the Church. It also made a very specific distinction between the catechists working in these areas and catechists at work in "older Churches" such as in the West. As such the detailed framework and structure this document outlines for the selection, formation, oversight and deployment of catechists within the "mission territories" has not necessarily been applied to catechists at work elsewhere within the Catholic Church.

The Introduction to this document states:

Note with Pastoral Recommendations for the Year of Faith
On 6 January 2012, the Solemnity of the Epiphany of the Lord, the Congregation for the Doctrine of the Faith published the Note with pastoral recommendations for the Year of Faith. This document provided explanation and suggestions at different levels for parishioners in preparation for the Year of Faith declared by Pope Benedict XVI with the apostolic letter of 11 October 2011 Porta fidei. The Year of Faith began on 11 October 2012, the 50th anniversary of the opening of the Second Vatican Council. It was scheduled to end on 24 November 2013, the Solemnity of our Lord Jesus Christ, Universal King.

This note made the following recommendations in relation to catechists:

At the diocesan level 
2. It would be desirable that each Diocese in the world organize a study day on the Catechism of the Catholic Church, particularly for its priests, consecrated persons and catechists.

5. It would be appropriate for each particular Church to review the reception of Vatican Council II and the Catechism of the Catholic Church in its own life and mission, particularly in the realm of catechesis. This would provide the opportunity for a renewal of commitment on the part of the catechetical offices of the Dioceses which – supported by the Commissions for Catechesis of the Episcopal Conferences – have the duty to care for the theological formation of catechists.

At the parish level 
4. Catechists should hold more firmly to the doctrinal richness of the Catechism of the Catholic Church and, under the direction of their pastors, offer guidance in reading this precious document to groups of faithful, working toward a deeper common understanding thereof, with the goal of creating small communities of faith, and of giving witness to the Lord Jesus.

Recognition of the ministry of catechist
There is increasing awareness, acknowledgement and recognition by the Church hierarchy of the important role catechists play in the life of the Catholic Church, and with it the responsibilities the Church has towards them. The latter is clear from the explicit reference in the Note with pastoral recommendations for the Year of Faith highlighting the "duty of care" each local Bishop has towards the theological formation of the catechists at work within their diocese.

On 11 May 2021, Pope Francis instituted the ministry of catechist with the apostolic letter and Motu proprio entitled 'Antiquum Ministerium'.

See also

Catholic spirituality
Gravissimum educationis
Lay ecclesial ministry
Life Teen
Rite of Christian Initiation of Adults
Universal call to holiness
Vocational Discernment in the Catholic Church
World Youth Day

References

External links
 General Directory for Catechesis
 Commentary on the General Directory for Catechesis
 The Marian Catechist Apostolate

Catholic theology and doctrine